The Erotic Traveler is a 2007 late-night Cinemax softcore television series directed by Gary Dean Orona and starring actresses Divini Rae and Kaylani Lei, both of whom are shown in intense sexual encounters.

Plot line
The episodes of this anthology series center around erotic photographer Marissa Johnson and her pupil Allison Kraft, two young women who use photographs and works of art to take episodic settings all over the world.

The setting for the series was in Greenriver, Utah.

Episode list
 "Molded Image" – February 3, 2007
 "Lost in Ecstasy" – February 10, 2007
 "A Man and Two Women" – February 17, 2007
 "Naked Pearls" – February 24, 2007
 "The Girl from Jimena" – March 3, 2007
 "Stripped" – March 10, 2007
 "Carnal Cabaret" – March 17, 2007
 "Baring It in Bali" – March 24, 2007
 "Object of Desire" – March 31, 2007
 "Sax on the Beach" – April 7, 2007
 "Closer" – April 14, 2007
 "Stolen Image" – April 21, 2007
 "Self Portrait" – April 28, 2007

References

External links
 

2007 American television series debuts
2007 American television series endings
2000s American romance television series
Cinemax original programming
Television series by Warner Bros. Television Studios
Erotic television series
American sex comedy television series